Angola is divided into eighteen provinces (províncias) and 163 municipalities. 

There are a total of 618 communes of Angola.

Provinces 

 Bengo
 Benguela
 Bié
 Cabinda
 Cuando Cubango
 Cuanza Norte
 Cuanza Sul
 Cunene
 Huambo
 Huila
 Luanda
 Lunda Norte
 Lunda Sul
 Malanje
 Moxico
 Namibe
 Uíge
 Zaire

References

 
Angola
Angola